The second and final season of the Colombian telenovela Pasión de Gavilanes takes place 20 years after the events of the first season, that aired in 2003. The season is produced by Telemundo Global Studios and CMO Producciones.

The season was announced on May 12, 2021, at Telemundo's upfront for the 2021-2022 television season. The season stars an ensemble cast featuring Danna García, Mario Cimarro, Juan Alfonso Baptista, Natasha Klauss, Paola Rey, and Zharick León, with Michel Brown in a guest role.

The season premiered on 14 February 2022 on Telemundo. It concluded on 31 May 2022.

Plot 
Twenty years after the events of the previous season, the Reyes-Elizondo family are forced to face new challenges that threaten their family. The murder of professor Genaro Carreño, shakes the family as evidence points to the sons of Juan and Norma as the culprits. Tensions continue to grow with the arrival of Samuel Caballero (Sergio Goyri), a powerful and cruel man who will not hesitate to do whatever it takes to get back his daughter and his wife, Rosario Montes (Zharick León), whose return to San Marcos has caught everyone's attention.

Cast

Main 
 Mario Cimarro as Juan Reyes Guerrero
 Danna García as Norma Elizondo Acevedo
 Juan Alfonso Baptista as Óscar Reyes Guerrero
 Paola Rey as Jimena Elizondo Acevedo
 Natasha Klauss as Sara "Sarita" Elizondo Acevedo
 Zharick León as Rosario Montes
 Bernardo Flores as Juan David Reyes
 Camila Rojas as Muriel Caballero
 Juan Manuel Restrepo as León Reyes
 Sebastián Osorio as Erick Reyes
 Yare Santana as Gaby Reyes
 Jerónimo Cantillo as Andrés Reyes
 Ángel de Miguel as Albín Duarte
 Alejandro López as Demetrio Jurado
 Germán Quintero as Martín Acevedo
 Kristina Lilley as Gabriela Acevedo de Elizondo
 Boris Schoemann as Pablo Gunter
 Katherine Porto as Romina Clemente

Recurring 
 Carmenza González as Quintina Canosa
 Tatiana Jáuregui as Dominga
 Constanza Hernández as Panchita López
 Jacobo Montalvo as Duván Clemente
 Jonathan Bedoya as Nino Barcha
 Sebastián Vega
 Valeria Caicedo as Sibila
 Álvaro García

Guest stars 
 Michel Brown as Franco Reyes Guerrero
 Sergio Goyri as Samuel Caballero

Episodes

Production

Development 
On 12 May 2021, Telemundo announced that it would be reviving Pasión de Gavilanes for a second season. Filming of the season began on 18 October 2021, and concluded in March 2022.

Casting 
The complete cast was confirmed on 18 October 2021, with Danna García, Mario Cimarro, Juan Alfonso Baptista, Natasha Klauss, Paola Rey, Zharick León, Kristina Lilley, Carmenza González, and Tatiana Jáuregui returning from the first season. Michel Brown initially declined to return for the second season, however, in November 2021, it was confirmed that he would be reprising his role of Franco Reyes.

Marketing 
To promote the new season, Telemundo began to show re-runs of the first season weekday afternoons beginning on 9 August 2021. On 19 January 2022, Telemundo released the first official trailer for the season.

References 

2022 American television seasons